The name Simone has been used for two tropical cyclones in the Eastern Pacific Ocean.

 Tropical Storm Simone (1961), a system which was later determined in a 2019 reanalysis to have not been a tropical cyclone.
 Tropical Storm Simone (1968), made landfall in Guatemala.

See also 
 St Jude storm (2013), was named Simone in Sweden.

Pacific hurricane set index articles